Ocellularia flavescens is a species of corticolous (bark-dwelling) lichen in the family Graphidaceae. Found in northern Thailand, it was formally described as a new species in 2002 by lichenologists Natsurang Homchantara and Brian J. Coppins. It is only known from the type collection at the type locality. The lichen has shiny, smooth, whitish to mineral-grey thallus. It contains lichexanthone, a secondary compound that is uncommon in genus Ocellularia. The presence of this chemical causes the lichen thallus to fluoresce a golden-yellow colour when lit with a long-wavelength (365 nm) UV light. This feature is referenced in its specific epithet flavescens (Latin for "becoming yellow or golden").

References

flavescens
Lichen species
Lichens described in 2002
Lichens of Thailand
Taxa named by Brian John Coppins
Taxa named by Natsurang Homchantara